The throwing stick or throwing club is a wooden rod with either a pointed tip or a spearhead attached to one end, intended for use as a weapon. A throwing stick can be either straight or roughly boomerang-shaped, and is much shorter than the javelin. It became obsolete as slings and bows became more prevalent, except on the Australian continent, where the native people continued refining the basic design. Throwing sticks shaped like returning boomerangs are designed to fly straight to a target at long ranges, their surfaces acting as airfoils. When tuned correctly they do not exhibit curved flight, but rather they fly on an extended straight flight path. Straight flight ranges greater than 100 meters have been reported by historical sources as well as in recent research.

Distribution 

The ancient Egyptians used throwing sticks to hunt small game and waterfowl, as seen in several wall paintings. The 18th-dynasty pharaoh Tutankhamun was a known lover of duck hunting and used the throwing stick in his hunts, and a number of throwing sticks were found in the tombs of pharaohs. Menceys, the kings of the ancient Guanches of the Canary Islands, also used throwing batons. Gimel, the third letter of many Semitic alphabets, may have been named after a weapon that was either a staff sling or a throwing stick, ultimately deriving from a Proto-Sinaitic glyph based on an Egyptian hieroglyph.

The Aborigines of Australia are well-known for their use of the boomerang. Although returning boomerangs are found in many Aboriginal cultures and will return to the user if thrown properly, the choice weapon of the Aborigines and most cultures was the heavy throwing stick, known internationally as the kylie. It was primarily used to kill kangaroos, wallabies, and emus from afar, though it could also be swung like a club.

Some Native American tribes such as the Hopi, as well as all southern California tribes, utilized the throwing stick to hunt rabbits and occasionally deer.

The throwing stick was also one of the first weapons used by European stone age people to hunt. 
Stone carvings in Brittany, France have been found depicting throwing sticks.

Though originally designed for hunting and survival, the throwing stick can be used as a weapon in human conflicts, though the heavy non-returning boomerang was the only variant ever to become truly effective against a human opponent.

Survival tool 
As a survival tool, the throwing stick is one of the most effective and easiest tools to obtain. It can be used as a digging tool for making fire-pits and underground shelters in addition to its function as a weapon. A curved branch will suffice as a basic throwing stick. Ancient throwing sticks were made of hardwood with a weighted or curved end to one side to impart momentum so the stick stays straight and does not wobble in mid-flight.

Variations 
Some variations of the throwing stick are two-to-three-foot long pieces of thick hardwood, usually about the circumference of the user's wrist. They are intended to be thrown with spin, creating the image of a blurry disc.

Pommel Point Throwing Sticks are noted for their slightly blunt points that can crush skulls if thrown at sufficient speed. Thus, they are also dubbed the "skull crusher" throwing stick.

Return boomerangs have a flat convex surface and must be thrown about 10-15 degrees from upright with a sharp flick of the wrist, but throwing sticks are thrown horizontally.

See also 
Spear-thrower (atlatl) – also called a throwing stick

 Boomerang – closely related to advanced throwing sticks, but with curved flight paths instead of straight ones

 Woomera – Aboriginal variant of the spear-thrower

References

   
Throwing clubs
Ancient weapons
Medieval weapons
Stick and staff weapons
Throwing weapons